Bosnia and Herzegovina competed at the 2009 World Championships in Athletics from 15–23 August in Berlin.

Results

Men
Field events

See also
 Bosnia and Herzegovina at the World Championships in Athletics

References

External links
Official competition website

Nations at the 2009 World Championships in Athletics
World Championships in Athletics
2009